Hazelwood is an unincorporated community in Liberty Township, Hendricks County, Indiana.

History
A post office was established at Hazelwood in 1884, and remained in operation until it was discontinued in 1937. The community was named for Daniel Hazelwood, a pioneer settler. It is also home to J.R. Edmondson who won the 2015 WCC 3200m track championship.

Geography

References

Unincorporated communities in Hendricks County, Indiana
Unincorporated communities in Indiana
Indianapolis metropolitan area